Am Timan (Arabic: أم تيمان, ʾUmm Tīmān) is a city in Chad and is the capital of the region of Salamat. Am Timan is also known as Dabengat in Chad, which mean the resources of the products. Most of economy comes from Salamat region such as fish, vegetables and anomalies meat etc. In Arabic, Am Timan means "mother of twins," although the reason for the name was back then there a female of Buffalo gave a twins birth in that particular place so the name came from there/ As the capital of the prefecture, it has the area' of many towns and villages around it including Zakuma national park. The city has no university but there are schools and colleges, and a clinic, and hosts a large market day and holiday celebrations.

During the conflict period, a cotton plantation and processing plant just outside the city were destroyed.

The city's sand airport was upgraded by the French Foreign Legion in 1971 to allow military air transports to supply the anti-rebel effort. At the time, the only practical way in or out of the city was by air.

Since the dry season lasts for about seven months of the year, water becomes a problem as the dry season progresses. Aquifers are accessed by digging deeper and deeper into the bed of the Bahr Salamat (river). The river starts flowing with the onset of rain, however, and the children enjoy swimming in it.

History

October 2006
On 23 October 2006, the city was claimed to be captured by Union of Forces for Democracy, the main Chadian rebel group. The government of Chad disputed this claim.

Demographics

Health 
In 2018, a lay first responder (LFR) program was launched to provide prehospital emergency medical services for residents. It was created by international collaborators from LFR International, Washington University in St. Louis, Red Cross of Chad, and the University of Michigan Medical School by training local motorcycle taxi drivers to provide first aid and transport.

References

Salamat Region
Populated places in Chad